Riyadh Air Base, formerly known as Riyadh International Airport from its opening in 1946 until 1983, is a military air base in Riyadh, Saudi Arabia. It was originally used by Saudia as an airline hub before King Khalid International Airport opened in 1983.

History 

Originally used for commercial flights by Saudi Arabia Airlines, the airport witnessed the destruction of Saudia Flight 163 on the night of August 19, 1980. The passengers and crew of the Lockheed L-1011-200, registration HZ-AHK, attempted to evacuate the smoke-filled cabin after landing but were unable to do so, and the aircraft later burst into flames and was destroyed on the tarmac. All 301 people aboard were killed in this disaster.

In December 1983, King Khalid International Airport was opened, which led to this airport becoming a Royal Saudi Air Force (RSAF) air base.

Current Status 
King Faisal Air Academy is located at the air base and uses Pilatus PC-9 aircraft for pilot training.  The base is also home to the Civil Defense fleet.  Riyadh Air Base has two crossing runways, with 19-01 as the primary and 15-33 as the alternate; however, 15-33 is now closed due to ongoing civilian infrastructure construction.  The base is also used as a standby base for the United States Air Force.

Accidents and incidents 

19 August 1980:  Saudia Flight 163, a Lockheed L-1011-200 operated by Saudia from Quaid-e-Azam International Airport in Karachi, Pakistan to Jeddah International Airport in Saudi Arabia via Riyadh, suffered a fire just after takeoff from Riyadh. However, due to poor coordination and inexperience, the crew used the entire length of runway 01 instead of performing an emergency stop, and parked on a taxiway at the end of the runway.  Additionally, the crew failed to switch off the engines immediately after coming to a stop, preventing firefighters from approaching.  The engines were shut down three minutes later, but no evacuation was attempted (likely due to the crew and passengers being either incapacitated or dead from smoke inhalation) and firefighters were unable to gain access into the interior of the aircraft for an additional 23 minutes.  The aircraft burst into flames three minutes after firefighter entry, and all 301 persons aboard died.  This was the most lethal accident involving an L-1011 and the deadliest aviation accident in Saudi Arabia as of 2021.

24 February 1985:  An RSAF KC-130H Hercules aerial refueling tanker was too high when approaching the airport's runway 01. The air traffic controller on duty requested that the aircraft make a 360-degree turn to decrease speed and altitude. However, the pilot instead decided to lose altitude by side-slipping, and the shifting of the fuel load caused the pilot to lose control and crash just short of the runway. All eight crew members died.

References

External links

Airports in Saudi Arabia